In enzymology, a beta-ketoacyl-acyl-carrier-protein synthase II is an enzyme that catalyzes the chemical reaction

(Z)-hexadec-11-enoyl-[acyl-carrier-protein] + malonyl-[acyl-carrier-protein]  (Z)-3-oxooctadec-13-enoyl-[acyl-carrier-protein] + CO2 + [acyl-carrier-protein]

Thus, the two substrates of this enzyme are (Z)-hexadec-11-enoyl-[acyl-carrier-protein] and malonyl-[acyl-carrier-protein], whereas its 3 products are (Z)-3-oxooctadec-13-enoyl-[acyl-carrier-protein], CO2, and acyl-carrier-protein.

This enzyme belongs to the family of transferases, specifically those acyltransferases transferring groups other than aminoacyl groups.  The systematic name of this enzyme class is (Z)-hexadec-11-enoyl-[acyl-carrier-protein]:malonyl-[acyl-carrier-pr otein] C-acyltransferase (decarboxylating). Other names in common use include KASII, KAS II, FabF, 3-oxoacyl-acyl carrier protein synthase I, and beta-ketoacyl-ACP synthase II.  This enzyme participates in fatty acid biosynthesis.

References

 
 
 
 
 
 Neidhardt, F.C. (Ed.), Escherichia coli and Salmonella: Cellular and Molecular Biology, 2nd ed., vol. 1, ASM Press, Washington, DC, 1996, p. 612-636.

EC 2.3.1
Enzymes of unknown structure